Charles (Carl) Rudolph Zorn (August 4, 1844 – September 25, 1916) was an American farmer and politician.

Born in what is now Germany, he settled in Schleswig, Wisconsin with his family in 1854. Zorn was a farmer. He served on the Schleswig Town Board and the Manitowoc County, Wisconsin Board of Supervisors. Zorn served in the Wisconsin State Assembly for Manitowoc County in 1873 and 1874, was not a candidate for re-election in the latter year (being succeeded by Fred Schmitz), and after the Assembly was redistricted returned to a somewhat different district in 1876. He died in Louis Corners, Wisconsin.

Notes

1844 births
1916 deaths
People from Manitowoc County, Wisconsin
Wisconsin city council members
County supervisors in Wisconsin
Members of the Wisconsin State Assembly
19th-century American politicians